Hellinsia mauleicus is a moth of the family Pterophoridae. It is found in Chile.

The wingspan is 15‑18 mm. The forewings are shiny white with ochreous markings. The hindwings are whitish‑grey and the fringes grey‑white. Adults are on wing in October and November.

References

Moths described in 1991
mauleicus
Pterophoridae of South America
Fauna of Chile
Moths of South America
Endemic fauna of Chile